Khvajeh Jamali (also Romanized as Khvājeh Jamālī; also known as Khājeh Jamālī and Khwāja Jamalī) is a village in Abadeh Tashk Rural District, Abadeh Tashk District, Neyriz County, Fars Province, Iran. At the 2006 census, its population was 2,857, in 717 families.

References 

Populated places in Abadeh Tashk County